Nitrosonium tetrafluoroborate, also called nitrosyl tetrafluoroborate, is a chemical compound with the chemical formula NOBF4. This colourless solid is used in organic synthesis as a nitrosating agent.

NOBF4 is the nitrosonium salt of fluoroboric acid, and is composed of a nitrosonium cation, [NO]+, and a tetrafluoroborate anion, [BF4]−.

Reactions
The dominant property of NOBF4 is the oxidizing power and electrophilic character of the nitrosonium cation. It forms colored charge transfer complexes with hexamethylbenzene and with 18-crown-6. The latter, a deep yellow species, provides a means to dissolve NOBF4 in dichloromethane.

Nitrosonium tetrafluoroborate may be used to prepare metal salts of the type [MII(CH3CN)x][BF4]2 (M = Cr, Mn, Fe, Co, Ni, Cu). The nitrosonium cation acts as the oxidizer, itself being reduced to nitric oxide gas:

 M + 2NOBF4 + xCH3CN → [M(CH3CN)x](BF4)2 + 2NO

With ferrocene the ferrocenium tetrafluoroborate is formed.

References

Tetrafluoroborates
Nitrosyl compounds